Bigger Than Both of Us is the fifth studio album by American pop music duo Daryl Hall and John Oates. The album was released on September 8, 1976, by RCA Records and peaked at #13 on the Billboard Top 200 Albums chart. The album included the first of their six #1 singles on the Billboard Hot 100, "Rich Girl" as well as the singles "Back Together Again" (which reached #28) and "Do What You Want, Be What You Are" (which peaked at #39). Hall & Oates released a song titled "Bigger Than Both of Us" on their Beauty on a Back Street album one year later. "Do What You Want, Be What You Are" was covered by The Dramatics in 1979.

Cash Box said of "Back Together Again" that "A flowing introduction belies the syncopated phrases that are the foundation of this record's layered verses" and that it contains "some striking instrumental effects."

Track listing

Personnel 

 Daryl Hall – lead vocals (except tracks 1, 3 and 8), backing vocals, keyboards, mandola, synthesizer, arrangements
 John Oates – lead vocals on tracks 1, 3 and 8, backing vocals, rhythm guitars, harmonica, arrangements
 Christopher Bond – lead guitars, keyboards, synthesizer, arrangements, string and horn arrangements
 Tom Hensley – acoustic piano
 Scotty Edwards – bass
 Leland Sklar – bass
 Jim Gordon – drums
 Ed Greene – drums
 Slugger Blue – "G kick" drums on "You'll Never Learn"
 Gary Coleman – percussion
 Tom Scott – flute, saxophone, Lyricon
 Charles DeChant – saxophone
 James Getzoff – concertmaster, conductor
 Stephen Dees – co-arrangements on "Kerry"

Production
 Produced by Christopher Bond 
 Engineered and Mixed by John Arrias and John Mills
 Strings engineered by Armin Steiner
 Recorded at Cherokee Studios (Hollywood, CA).
 Mixed at Sound Labs (Hollywood, CA).
 Mastered by Allen Zentz at Allen Zentz  Mastering (San Clemente, CA).
 Cover Artwork – Ron Barry
 Cover Concept and Design – Daryl Hall
 Cover Photo – Gribbitt Photography
 Insert Photo – Kathy Hohl and Sam Emmerson

References

1976 albums
Hall & Oates albums
RCA Records albums